Centaurium tenuiflorum, the slender centaury, is a species of annual herb in the family Gentianaceae. They have a self-supporting growth form and simple, broad leaves. Individuals can grow to 17 cm tall.

Sources

References 

tenuiflorum
Flora of Malta